This is the list of tourist attractions in Kuala Lumpur, Malaysia.

Community
 Brickfields
 Petaling Street

Convention centres
 Kuala Lumpur Convention Centre
 Malaysia International Trade and Exhibition Centre (MITEC)
 MATRADE Exhibition and Convention Centre
 Putra World Trade Centre (WTC KL)

Galleries
 National Visual Arts Gallery
 Petronas Gallery

Historical buildings
 DBKL City Theatre
 Lee Rubber Building
 Sultan Abdul Samad Building

Libraries
 National Library of Malaysia

Memorials
 Heroes' Mausoleum
 National Monument

Museums
 Islamic Arts Museum Malaysia
 Maybank Numismatic Museum
 National History Museum
 National Museum
 National Textile Museum
 Royal Malaysian Police Museum
 Royal Museum

Nature
 ASEAN Sculpture Garden
 KLCC Park
 Lake Gardens
 Padang Balang
 Nanas Hill
 Rimba Ilmu Botanical Gardens

Palace 

 Istana Negara (National Palace)

Performing centres
 Coliseum Theatre
 Istana Budaya
 Kuala Lumpur Performing Arts Centre
 Petronas Philharmonic Hall

Public squares
 Merdeka Square
 Medan Pasar

Religious places

Buddhist temples
 Buddhist Maha Vihara
 Sri Lanka Buddhist Temple, Sentul

Chinese temples
 Sin Sze Si Ya Temple
 Thean Hou Temple

Churches
 St. John's Cathedral
 St. Mary's Cathedral

Hindu temples
 Sri Kandaswamy Kovil
 Sri Mahamariamman Temple

Mosques
 Federal Territory Mosque
 Jamek Mosque
 National Mosque of Malaysia

Science centres
 National Planetarium
 National Science Centre

Shopping centres
AEON-Maluri
Berjaya Times Square
 Bukit Bintang
 Central Market
 Fahrenheit 88
 LaLaport Bukit Bintang City Centre
 Lot 10
 Low Yat Plaza
 Sunway Putra Mall
 Mid Valley Megamall
 Pavilion Kuala Lumpur
 Quill City Mall
 Starhill Gallery
 Sungei Wang Plaza
Sunway Velocity Mall
 Suria KLCC
 The Gardens Mall

Skyscrapers
 Petronas Twin Towers
Merdeka 118
The Exchange 106

Sport centres
 National Sports Complex
 Stadium Merdeka
Chin Woo Stadium
Axiata Arena

Theme parks
 Berjaya Times Square Theme Park

Towers
 Kuala Lumpur Tower

Transportation
 Kuala Lumpur Railway Station

Zoo
 Aquaria KLCC
 Kuala Lumpur Bird Park
 Kuala Lumpur Butterfly Park

See also

 List of tourist attractions in Malaysia

References

 
Kuala Lumpur
Kuala Lumpur